Elliot Kebbie (born 11 September 1994) is an English former professional footballer of Sierra Leonean descent. A graduate of Leeds United's academy, he played as a defender or midfielder for  Atlético Madrid C, Rangers and Sandefjord and the England U-16 team.

Career

Club
Elliot Kebbie is the son of the former rugby league and rugby union player, and rugby union coach Brimah Kebbie. Kebbie joined Leeds United from Brighouse Juniors at the age of seven, remaining in the club's youth system for nine years.

After spending two months on trial with Barcelona in 2011, Kebbie eventually signed for Atlético Madrid in January 2012. Kebbie went on loan to Rangers in August 2012, before being forced to return to his home town after being struck down by the Epstein–Barr virus, which forced him out of the game for eighteen months.

On 23 January 2014, Kebbie signed a short-term contract with Premier League side Hull City, to aid his rehabilitation before then going on trial with Doncaster Rovers in July 2014. He joined Brighouse Town in October 2014.

In July 2015, Kebbie had overcome a post viral fatigue syndrome and joined Salford City, before signing briefly for Bradford Park Avenue, and then immediately a six-month contract with Barnsley's development squad on 12 July 2016. In November 2016 Kebbie went on trial with Birmingham City but decided upon regular first team football at Sandefjord in Norway.

Sandefjord
In January 2017, Kebbie joined Sandefjord on trial, eventually signing for the club and making his debut for Sandefjord on 5 April 2017, in a 3–0 defeat to Rosenborg.

Billericay Town
In August 2017 Kebbie returned to England to sign for Billericay Town. After a few weeks with Billericay Town it was alleged that club owner Glenn Tamplin wanted to reduce his wages and even offered him a payoff before also sending 'Gangster Threats' to Kebbie. He left the club in February 2018.

International
In August 2009, Kebbie was called up to the England U-16 squad, playing three matches.

Career statistics

Club

References

External links
 
 Sandefjord Profile

1994 births
Living people
English sportspeople of Sierra Leonean descent
English footballers
Atlético Madrid C players
Rangers F.C. players
Hull City A.F.C. players
Bradford (Park Avenue) A.F.C. players
Brighouse Town F.C. players
Salford City F.C. players
Barnsley F.C. players
Sandefjord Fotball players
Billericay Town F.C. players
Eliteserien players
Isthmian League players
Association football defenders
English expatriate footballers
Expatriate footballers in Norway
English expatriate sportspeople in Norway
Leeds United F.C. players